Kidz in Space is a New Zealand pop and hip-hop group, consisting of Josh Fountain, Ashley Hughes and Mat "Neesh" Neshat. Their costumed media appearances have been likened to those of band, Split Enz.

Formation
Hughes and Neshat knew each other for ten years prior to forming the band, before meeting Fountain. They describe N.E.R.D as one of their main musical influences.

Discography

Extended plays

Singles

References

External links

Kidz in Space on Myspace

New Zealand boy bands
New Zealand musical trios
New Zealand hip hop groups